Júlio César Rocha Costa (born 12 May 1980), known as just Júlio César, is a Brazilian football player. He currently plays for Ferroviaria Futebol S.A.

Biography
Júlio César signed a 3-year deal with Osasco in January 2004. He left for Portuguesa Santista in December 2004 until the end of 2005 Campeonato Paulista. In April he was sold to São Caetano, signing 3-year contract.

In 2007, he joined Juventude. He left for fellow Rio Grande do Sul club Caxias in January 2008 in 1-year contract. In September he left for Gamain short-term deal. In January 2009 he was signed by Mogi Mirim until the end of 2009 Campeonato Paulista. In April he was re-signed by Caxias. In August 2009 he left for Noroeste in 1-year deal. In May 2010 he signed a new 1-year deal and left for Criciúma. After his contract with Noroeste expired, he joined Marília and in September left for ICASA in short-term deal.

Club statistics

References

External links
 

Brazilian footballers
Tokyo Verdy players
Associação Atlética Portuguesa (Santos) players
Associação Desportiva São Caetano players
Esporte Clube Juventude players
Sociedade Esportiva e Recreativa Caxias do Sul players
Sociedade Esportiva do Gama players
Mogi Mirim Esporte Clube players
Esporte Clube Noroeste players
Criciúma Esporte Clube players
Marília Atlético Clube players
Associação Desportiva Recreativa e Cultural Icasa players
J1 League players
Association football midfielders
Brazilian expatriate footballers
Brazilian expatriate sportspeople in Japan
Expatriate footballers in Japan
Sportspeople from Santos, São Paulo
1980 births
Living people